Germany women's national floorball team is the national team of Germany. , the team was ranked eleventh by the International Floorball Federation.

References 

Women's national under-19 floorball teams
Floorball
Floorball in Germany